Pertusaria allanii is a species of saxicolous (rock-dwelling) and crustose lichen in the family Pertusariaceae. Found in New Zealand, it was scientifically described as a new species in 1941 by Austrian-Hungarian lichenologist Alexander Zahlbruckner. The type specimen was collected from Waiheke Island (North Island), where it was found growing on coastal rock. The specific epithet allanii honours the collector, New Zealand botanist Harry Allan. As of 2018, in the New Zealand Threat Classification System, the lichen is considered "At Risk – Naturally Uncommon".

See also
List of Pertusaria species

References

allanii
Lichen species
Lichens described in 1941
Lichens of New Zealand
Taxa named by Alexander Zahlbruckner